Mia Carruthers (born March 30, 1991) is a singer-songwriter, bassist, and music producer.

In the late-2000s, she was one of the main cast members of MTV's Taking the Stage. 
Carruthers and her family moved from West Chester Township to Cincinnati so that Mia could enroll at the School for Creative and Performing Arts (S.C.P.A.) as a freshman, majoring in music. Since then she has performed at coffeehouses in the local area. She plays several instruments: the guitar, alto saxophone and the piano. Carruthers comes from a musical family. From 2007 to 2012, she and her brother Alex played in her rock band "Mia Carruthers and the Retros". Her singer-songwriter father, Dan Carruthers, recorded three albums with Jackbone, a Zanesville rock band. Carruthers released an EP album titled We Will Grow, available on iTunes.

From 2013 to 2015, she co-fronted the shoegaze pop group Multimagic. In 2016, she became the Artist Production head at Gwynne Sound studios in Cincinnati, OH. She is now currently the lead vocalist and bassist of synthpop trio Passeport

References

1991 births
Living people
American women singer-songwriters
21st-century American women singers
21st-century American singers